Vital Alsar Ramírez (August 7, 1933 – September 15, 2020) was a sailor and scientist who made several extremely long sailing expeditions.  
His entire life was linked to nature and the sea. He became professor of economics, although he never acted as such.

During his Military service in Morocco, Alsar read a book about the Kon-Tiki, the expedition that Thor Heyerdahl conducted in a balsa raft on the Pacific. Reading this account led to his interest in duplicating the feat, to sailing .
After his military service, he lived in France, Stuttgart, Hamburg, and Canada. It was in Canada where he met Marc Modena, who became his traveling companion.

Expeditions

Ecuador to Australia by raft

Between 1966 and 1973, Alsar led three expeditions by raft across the Pacific Ocean, from Ecuador and Australia. The first took place in 1966, using a simple raft, La Pacífica. The voyage was cut short by damage caused by teredo worms in the wood of his raft, which sank after 143 days—Alsar being rescued by a German ship. A third voyage in 1972 featured three rafts. They reached the coast of Ballina, Australia after 179 days at sea (one of the three foundering in Australian waters).

Mexico-Spain-Mexico, Mar, hombre y paz
 Vital later replaced the rafts with galleons to carry out the project "Mar, hombre y paz", which was begun in 1980. This expedition took the trapo blanco (white rag), around the world on board the La Marigalante.

Last expedition: Mexico-Greece-Mexico, El Niño, La Mar y La Paz
Alsar resided in Veracruz, Mexico, and spent his time with his grandchildren and profiling a new project aiming to unite all of the marine world. The project was called  ("The Boy, the Sea and the Peace"), and consisted of carrying a child and thirteen crew aboard a trimaran named Itzamna (the Mayan god of knowledge), later named Zamná. It set sail in 2009 from the Mexican island Cozumel, making port in a number of countries

Awards
He has received numerous awards for his career, most notably from the Spanish Geographical Society, or the Adena International, of the Society for the Protection of Nature. The latter is represented by a "Golden Dolphin" by Salvador Dalí, which he shared with Philippe Cousteau.

References

1933 births
2020 deaths
People from Santander, Spain
Scientists from Cantabria
Sailors from Cantabria
20th-century Spanish scientists
21st-century Spanish scientists
Replications of ancient voyages
 Spanish expatriates in Mexico